Meighan Sharee Simmons (born January 25, 1992) is a professional basketball Guard. She was selected in the third round of the 2014 WNBA Draft, 26th overall. Meighan was born in Cibolo, Texas and attended the University of Tennessee. She was nicknamed "Speedy" by legendary Tennessee Women's Basketball coach Pat Summitt. She played overseas in Romania in 2015 for ICIM Arad leading the team in scoring with 16.4 points per game and averaged almost 4 assists and 4 rebounds as well, shooting 55% from the floor and 36% from 3 point range.

College
Simmons played four years of basketball at the University of Tennessee. She was a four-year starter, and was a two-time SEC player of the year award winner.

College Stats:
Freshman— 13.5 pts, 2.8 assists, 2.7 rebounds, 34% 3PT
Sophomore— 11.1 pts, 2.0 assists, 2.3 rebounds, 31% 3PT
Junior— 16.8 pts, 2.7 assists, 3.6 rebounds, 37% 3PT
Senior— 16.5 pts, 2.3 assists, 2.7 rebounds, 36% 3PT

Tennessee  statistics
Source

WNBA
Simmons was drafted 26th overall of the 2014 WNBA Draft by the New York Liberty. On May 12, 2014, Simmons was waived by the Liberty after appearing all three preseason games for the Liberty. On February 20, 2015, Simmons signed with the Seattle Storm. On March 3, 2016, it was announced that Simmons signed with the Atlanta Dream.

References

External links
Tennessee Lady Volunteers bio
WNBA profile

1992 births
Living people
All-American college women's basketball players
American expatriate basketball people in Romania
American women's basketball players
Atlanta Dream players
McDonald's High School All-Americans
New York Liberty draft picks
People from Cibolo, Texas
Point guards
Tennessee Lady Volunteers basketball players
Byron P. Steele High School alumni